Alan Richard Alder (14 September 1937 - 15 July 2019) was an Australian ballet dancer and ballet teacher.

Alder was born in Canberra in 1937. After training that included a scholarship to the Royal Ballet School, twelve months with the Covent Garden Opera Ballet and touring internationally as soloist with Sadler's Wells Royal Ballet, Alder returned to Australia in 1963 and rose to principal artist and then guest artist with the Australian Ballet.

He married fellow artist Lucette Aldous in 1972. Alan held the position Head of Dance at the Western Australian Academy of Performing Arts, Edith Cowan University Perth, Western Australia from 1983 to 1991.

Alder died on 15 July 2019 aged 82.

References

External links 
 

1937 births
2019 deaths
People educated at the Royal Ballet School
Australian male ballet dancers
People from Canberra
Ballet teachers